The 2004 Humboldt State Lumberjacks football team represented Humboldt State University during the 2004 NCAA Division II football season. Humboldt State competed in the Great Northwest Athletic Conference (GNAC).

The 2004 Lumberjacks were led by fifth-year head coach Doug Adkins. They played home games at the Redwood Bowl in Arcata, California. Humboldt State finished the season with a record of five wins and five losses (5–5, 3–3 GNAC). The Lumberjacks were outscored by their opponents 221–253 for the 2004 season. This season marked a change in scheduling for the GNAC. Each team played the other conference teams twice during the season (home and away) instead of just once. That practice would continue through the 2013 season.

Schedule

Notes

References

Humboldt State
Humboldt State Lumberjacks football seasons
Humboldt State Lumberjacks football